IHBA may refer to:

International Hemp Building Association,  an industry association founded in 2009
International Hot Boat Association, which hosts the Lucas Oil Drag Boat Racing Series

See also
Institute of Human Behaviour and Allied Sciences (IHBAS or IHBA&S), a mental health and neurosciences research institute based in New Delhi, India